Hard rock is a genre of rock music.

Hard rock or Hard Rock may also refer to:

Brands and enterprises
 Hard Rock Cafe, a chain of theme restaurants and hotels owned by the Seminole Tribe of Florida
 Freestyle Music Park in Myrtle Beach, South Carolina, formerly Hard Rock Park
 Hard Rock Cafe, at The Printworks in Manchester, United Kingdom (closed)
 Hard Rock Hotel, at the City of Dreams in Macau, China
 Hard Rock Hotel, at the Resorts World Sentosa in Singapore
 Hard Rock Hotel and Casino (Atlantic City), in Atlantic City, New Jersey 
 Hard Rock Hotel and Casino (Biloxi), in Biloxi, Mississippi
 Hard Rock Hotel and Casino (Stateline), in Stateline, Nevada, owned and operated by Warner Hospitality
 Hard Rock Hotel Orlando at the Universal Orlando Resort, a joint venture between Hard Rock Cafe and Loews Hotels
 Hard Rock Hotel Penang
 Seminole Hard Rock Hotel and Casino Hollywood, in Hollywood, Florida
 Seminole Hard Rock Hotel and Casino Tampa, in Tampa, Florida

Sports
 Hard Rock FC, a Grenadian football club that competes in the Grenadian Premier Division league
 Hardrock Hundred Mile Endurance Run, or "Hardrock 100", a long-distance endurance run in Colorado

Other uses
 Hard Rock, a DC Comics character
 Hard rock mining, mining of metals and other hard minerals
 Hard ROCK!, a difficulty level in the 2006 rhythm video game Elite Beat Agents
 Hard Rock (exercise), a planned 1982 British civil defence exercise

See also
 Hard (disambiguation)
 Heavy rock (disambiguation)
 Rock (disambiguation)
 Soft Rock (disambiguation)